A statue of Diego de Vargas was installed in 2007 at the west end of Santa Fe, New Mexico's Cathedral Park, in the United States. The statue was removed in June 2020

Controversy over storage 
While the statue's fate is being debated, the statue was at the center of a controversy on where it has been stored and if it is being protected. In early February the statue was found in the backyard of a private residence home (which was not disclosed for privacy and safety concerns). 
The mayor and city manager had been told that the statue was in a city facility. This has led to concerns that the statue was at risk of damage or vandalism.

Fate  
The statue's fate is currently being determined. Supporters of removal see the statue as a celebration of Spanish colonization, while supporters of the statue say it is a celebration of Spain and Hispanic heritage. Former Santa Fe mayoral candidate Ronald Trujillo has expressed interest in the statue being donated back to the Caballeros De Vargas which would then redisplay it on their own property. This request has been supported by multiple members of the city council. Councilman Christopher Rivera stated, "I would be in favor of that, especially if we can't take care of it".

See also 
 List of monuments and memorials removed during the George Floyd protests

References 

Hispanic and Latino American culture in Santa Fe, New Mexico
buildings and structures in Santa Fe, New Mexico
monuments and memorials in New Mexico
monuments and memorials removed during the George Floyd protests
outdoor sculptures in New Mexico
sculptures of men in the United States
statues in the United States
Statues removed in 2020